The samodiva (plural: samodivi), samovila (plural: samovili) or vila (plural: vili), are woodland fairies or nymphs found in South and West Slavic folklore.

Etymology
The words samodiva and samovila have Indo-European roots meaning "divinity", "rave", "wild", or "rage".

Appearance
Samodivas are commonly depicted as ethereal maidens with long, loose hair, and in some cases, wings. They are typically dressed in free-flowing, feathered white gowns, which give them the power of flight. Samodivas are often described as blonde, tall, slender women with pale, glowing skin and fiery eyes.

Habitat
According to folklore, Samodivas can live inside trees or abandoned shacks or dark caves, or near rivers, ponds and wells. Mountains linked to the Samodivas include Vitosha, Belasitsa, Pirin, Rila, the Rhodopes, the Balkan Mountains in Bulgaria and Rudina mountains. However, mountain Pirin is their traditional favorite. Samodivas enter the human world during the spring, staying until autumn. During the winter, they live in the mythical village of Zmajkovo.

In Macedonian folklore they were also said to inhabit trees like oak, willows and that they live in a far off village called Patelevo.

Abilities and habits

Samodivas are believed to be very beautiful women with an affinity for fire. They have the power to bring about drought, burn a farmer's crops, or make cattle die of high fever. It is said that, when angered, a Samodiva can change her appearance and turn into a monstrous bird, capable of throwing fire at her enemies. This, with the power of their seductive voices, makes them somewhat similar to Harpies and Sirens in Greek mythology. Their vindictive nature also complements this notion. 

They are usually hostile and dangerous to people. Men who gaze upon a Samodiva fall instantly in love (or at least in lust), and women take their own lives at the sight of such beauty. Sometimes a Samodiva would seduce a man, commonly a shepherd or a trespasser in her forest, and take him for her lover. However, in doing so, she would take all of his life energy. The man would then become obsessed with the Samodiva and chase her relentlessly, unable to think of anything else. The Samodiva, fueled by the energy stolen from her admirer, would then proceed to torture the man until he died of exhaustion.

Another important aspect of the myths surrounding Samodivas is their dance. Beginning at midnight and finishing at dawn, their dance symbolized the raw energy of both nature and the supernatural world. Accompanied and following only the rhythm of the wind and their own singing, their dance was said to have been often witnessed by lost or late travelers, some of them choosing to join it, seduced by the beauty of their song and visage, only to die of exhaustion at dawn, when the Samodivas finally disappeared.

Much like the Vila in Slavic folklore, a Samodiva's power is believed to come mostly from her long (usually blond) hair. A Samodiva would sometimes give a small portion of it to her lover to strengthen her control over him via its magical effects. However, if her hair is damaged in some way, she will either disappear entirely or be stripped of her powers and beauty.

In Bulgarian folklore, a Samodiva's close connection to the forest makes her knowledgeable about magical herbs and cures for all illnesses. It is said that if a person managed to eavesdrop on a gathering of Samodivas he could also gain knowledge of these remedies. In many stories, this is exactly what the hero is forced to do to save a loved one, as a Samodiva would never share her secrets willingly.  

In Macedonian folklore, Samovila's are often seen that they have the ability to hurt people or to heal them. There is a way to kill a Samovila, and that is by making her prick herself on thorn bushes and evaporates. It is also known that they could enter the hearts of men and stay there for 5 years. Their goal was to join with the man's soul and after go to heaven together. They usually gave the man magical powers and knowledge of healing plants. In North Macedonia, there are tales speaking of Samovilski Weddings, and if a random person was found walking by, they would offer him wine and in return he would give a golden coin to the bride. The wedding would then last all night until dawn.   

It is also known that they can be seen by dogs with four eyes and mixed Samovilski children.   

Their voices were hypnotic and could drive a man to go crazy. The Macedonian people feared of calling them by their name Vili, so sometimes they would speak of them as Mayki, Yudi, They.  

Balkan mythology holds that Samodivas were the daughters of Lamia. This, combined with their mostly nocturnal nature, leads to them being considered negative, or at best neutral in their nature.

History
Earliest written evidence of Samodivas dates back to the 13th century, where they presumably developed from Balkan traditions and myths.  Researchers have also found influences from other Slavic folklore. It is widely believed that the image of the Samodiva and their behavior is actually based on ancient Thracian legends, especially those connected to the Cult of Orpheus, which included songs and dances performed by fire-priestesses.

Vila Samodiva
In Bulgarian and Serbian folklore, "Vila Samodiva" (or "Vila Samovila") is used to describe the Samodiva maiden who leads the others in their dances. She is usually the active participant of the contact between the protagonist of folktales and the mystical world, serving as a guide or giving the hero a task to test his valour and resolve.

In one folk tale, Vila found Prince Marko as an infant and brought him up as a foster mother. As Marko grew on Samodiva milk, he acquired supernatural powers.

The character of the Vila is attested in South Slavic fairy tales collected by Friedrich Salomon Krauss.

In poetry
In the 19th century, Bulgarian poet and revolutionary Hristo Botev mentioned Samodivas in a poem praising the late Voivoda Hadzhi Dimitar. The Samodivas provide comfort to the dying man in the last moments of his life, symbolizing bravery. They also appear to symbolize the union between him and the land he sacrificed himself to protect.  Still, the Samodivas and the reaction of Hadzhi Dimitar to their presence is connected to the mischievous and seductive role they often play in mythology.

Samodiva as supernatural wife
A Bulgarian folk song (The Samodiva married against her will) features a Samodiva: three girls, not related to each other, doff their magical garments to bathe, but are seen by a shepherd that takes their clothing. Each girl separately try to plead and convince the youth to return the clothing. He does so - but only to the first two; the third maiden he chose to wed after she revealed she was an only child. After the wedding, the village insists she dances for the amusement of everyone else, but the samodiva says she cannot dance without her garment. Once her husband delivers her the clothing, she flies away.

In the fairy tale The Youth and the Vila, the youngest son, who is considered a fool by his two elder brothers, manages to pluck the golden hairs of a vila who has been eating the silver pears of his father's garden. He later takes her back to his father's house. In a second tale, The Vila in the Golden Castle, a father asks his three sons to guard his flower garden at night, because swans have been eating the flowers (in reality, the vilas were). The vila returns home to the golden castle, which prompts the youth to seek her. There, an old vila, the girl's mother, sets tasks for him to perform.

References

Further reading 
 Hartland, E. Sidney. The science of fairy tales: An inquiry into fairy mythology. London: W. Scott. pp. 267, 312-313.
 Алещенко, Е. И. (2015). "Болгарские сказки о самовилах как отражение фольклорной картины мира" [Bulgarian fairy tales about samovilas as the reflection of the folklore world picture]. In: Известия Волгоградского государственного педагогического университета, (3 (98)), 177-183. URL: https://cyberleninka.ru/article/n/bolgarskie-skazki-o-samovilah-kak-otrazhenie-folklornoy-kartiny-mira (дата обращения: 19.12.2021).
 Trefilova, Olga (2020). "Bulgarian Folk Demonology: A Brief Overview". In: Slavic World in the Third Millennium. 15. 169-170. DOI: 10.31168/2412-6446.2020.15.3-4.11. URL: https://cyberleninka.ru/article/n/bolgarskaya-narodnaya-demonologiya-kratkiy-obzor (дата обращения: 19.12.2021). (In Russian)

Bulgarian folklore
Serbian folklore
North Macedonia folklore
Nav'
Nature spirits
Forest spirits
Female legendary creatures